Tomás Carbonell and Daniel Orsanic were the defending champions but did not compete that year.

Lucas Arnold and Luis Lobo won in the final 6–4, 4–6, 6–2 against František Čermák and Leoš Friedl.

Seeds
Champion seeds are indicated in bold text while text in italics indicates the round in which those seeds were eliminated.

 Petr Pála /  Pavel Vízner (first round)
 František Čermák /  Leoš Friedl (final)
 Simon Aspelin /  Andrei Olhovskiy (first round)
 Jeff Coetzee /  Chris Haggard (semifinals)

Draw

External links
 2002 Campionati Internazionali di Sicilia Doubles draw

Campionati Internazionali di Sicilia
2002 ATP Tour
Camp